This is a list of minor warships of World War II. It contains minor combat vessels that are generally under 1,000 t standard displacement, and includes fast attack craft, submarine chasers, gunboats, missile boats, torpedo boats and patrol boats. It also contains similar vessels, over 1,000 t, such as patrol vessels or patrol ships.

The List of ships of the World War II contains military vessels of the war, arranged alphabetically and by type. The list includes armed vessels that served during the war and in the immediate aftermath, inclusive of localized ongoing combat operations, garrison surrenders, post-surrender occupation, colony re-occupation, troop  and prisoner repatriation, to the end of 1945. For smaller vessels, see also List of World War II ships of less than 1000 tons. Some uncompleted Axis ships are included, out of historic interest. Ships are designated to the country under which they operated for the longest period of the World War II, regardless of where they were built or previous service history.

See also 
 List of major World War II warships built by minor powers

References

Bibliography

World War II naval ships
Minor warships